Vranjak is a village in the municipality of Modriča, Republika Srpska, Bosnia and Herzegovina.

See also
FK Vranjak

References

Populated places in Modriča